Mexico sent a delegation to compete at the 2010 Winter Paralympics in Vancouver, British Columbia, Canada. The country fielded two athletes, both in alpine skiing.

Alpine skiing 

Mexico's two representatives in alpine skiing were Arly Velásquez and Armando Ruiz.

See also
Mexico at the 2010 Winter Olympics

References

External links
Vancouver 2010 Paralympic Games official website
International Paralympic Committee official website

Nations at the 2010 Winter Paralympics
2010
Paralympics